Lasse Mellberg (born 2 October 1977), better known by his stage name Redrama, is a Finnish rapper. He made a breakthrough in 2003. Redrama, who performs primarily in English, but also in Swedish and Finnish was part of a hip-hop group Alien Allies which also included the Norwegian Paperboys and Madcon. Redrama won the English-language Finnish championship of rapping in 2001 and he also won the Finnish Grammy (Emma) award for The Best Hip Hop Album in 2005.

His first EP, Redrama EP, was released in 2001. The EP included seven tracks and it was released by Incredible Productions. In 2002, Redrama signed a recording contract with Virgin UK and his debut album, Everyday Soundtrack, was released in 2003. His second studio album, Street Music, was released two years later.

In 2005, Redrama won an EBBA Award. European Border Breakers Awards is presented annually to ten emerging artists or groups who have reached audiences outside their own countries with their first internationally released album in the past year.

After winning the European Border Breakers Award, Redrama joined Gang Starr as a supporting artist on their European Tour. In 2007, Redrama recorded his first duet with another popular Finnish hip hop artist, Paleface. The single "Still In Charge" reached number 4 on the Finnish Single Charts and was the start to the collaboration between these two most successful English-speaking rappers in Finland. In 2008 and 2009, the collaboration expanded when Redrama and Paleface were joined by a reggae musician and singer CapeNape and a Swedish hip hop artist Promoe of Looptroop Rockers. The four rappers toured around Finland under the name Conscious Youth. The group released one album in Finland.

Redrama's third studio album, The Getaway, was released in June 2009 by the most well-known hip hop label in Finland, Rähinä Records. The first single released from the album was "Music".

After a short stint as a Rähinä Records artist Redrama established his own production company and label called Non-Genre.

In 2012, the news spread that Redrama was working in Amsterdam together with A.J. McLean of Backstreet Boys. New single release, "Clouds", featuring A.J. McLean, was released in May 2013. Despite the lack of large marketing campaigns, the news about the single were reported widely all over the world mainly through the Backstreet Boys fan websites and blogs. "Clouds" was the first single release for Redrama's studio album Reflection.

Personal life 

Redrama is bilingual and grew up in a Finnish-Swedish family. 

He follows a straight edge lifestyle and has been sober since 2010.

Discography

Albums

EPs 
2001: Redrama EP
2009: Samma på svenska
2011: Pakkå Ruåtsi (with Jesse P)

Mixtapes
2011: Cabin Fever Diaries Vol. 1

Singles 
(charting)

Other releases
2005: "Rest of Your Life"
2005: "Don't Know What to Tell You"
2009: "Music"
2009: "Du"
2011: "Sail On"
2011: "F.R.E.E."
2011: "Måndag till söndag" (with Jesse P)
2012: "Gottabe"

Featured in
2011: "Worst Part Is Over" (Anna Abreu feat. Redrama)
2012: "Same Thing Different" (The Mood feat. Lazee & Redrama)
2012: "Lämpöö" (Brädi feat. Redrama)
2014: "Tuhatta" (Janne Ordén feat. Redrama)

References

External links 
 

1977 births
Living people
Finnish rappers
Swedish-speaking Finns